Valeriy Oleksіyovich Baranov, served as Governor of Zaporizhzhia Oblast, March – October 2014 and a former People's Deputy of Ukraine.

Biography 
Valery Baranov was born on April 19, 1957 in Berdyansk. He is married, his spouse Natalya (b. 1956) is a housewife; they have two daughters: Marina (b. 1977) - a private entrepreneur and Olga (b. 1998).

Education
 In 1979 he graduated from Zhdanov Metallurgical Institute (major "Technology of mechanical engineering, machine tools and instruments", with qualification "Mechanical Engineer").
 In 2001 - graduated from the Dnipropetrovsk branch of the National Academy of Public Administration under the President of Ukraine (major "State Administration" with qualification "Master of Public Administration").

Career
 1979 - the repairman of process equipment at Berdyansk plant "Yuzhgidromash"
 1980-1981 - Production Engineer at "Yuzhgidromash"
 September - December 1981 - Secretary of the Komsomol Committee of Berdyansk engineering college
 1981-1986 - second, then first Secretary of Berdyansk city Komsomol Committee
 1986-1988 - Deputy Head of the shop at "Yuzhgidromash"
 1988-1990 - Head of the organizational department of Berdyansk city Communist Party committee
 1990-1991 - Second Secretary of Berdyansk city Communist Party committee
 1991-1998 - CEO of manufacturing enterprise "Avanta" (Berdyansk)
In April 1998 was elected the mayor of Berdyansk.

Politics

Since 23 November 2007 Valery Baranov has been elected as People's Deputy of Ukraine from Lytvyn Bloc (in November the faction 2010 renamed itself to People's Party).
In 2007-2010 - Deputy Head of the Verkhovna Rada Committee on Construction, Urban Development, Housing and Regional Policy. 
In November 2010 Valery Baranov was appointed the Head of the Budget Committee.

Baranov did not return to parliament after the 2012 Ukrainian parliamentary election after losing in single-member districts number 78 (first-past-the-post wins a parliament seat) located in Zaporizhzhia Oblast.

On 4 March 2014 Baranov was appointed Governor of Zaporizhzhia Oblast by acting President of Ukraine Oleksandr Turchynov.

During the 2020 Ukrainian local elections Baranov was elected the mayor of Berdyansk as a candidate of For the Future. On 16 November 2021 he resigned as mayor due to their not being a majority in the city council.

Awards

 December 2000 - Diploma of the Cabinet of Ministers of Ukraine
 December 2000 - Order of Merits of the III class, II class - June 2007
 "Golden Dolphin" award (nominated for "City and Regional Manager of the Year")
 2002 -  a commemorative  "For regіonal development"
 2005 - "Professional Award" badge of Federation of Trade Unions of Ukraine

See also 
 2007 Ukrainian parliamentary election
 List of Ukrainian Parliament Members 2007
 Verkhovna Rada

External links 
  Valery Baranov' profile at Verkhovna Rada of Ukraine official web-site

References 

Living people
People from Berdiansk
Pryazovskyi State Technical University alumni
Russians in Ukraine
Komsomol of Ukraine members
Sixth convocation members of the Verkhovna Rada
Communist Party of Ukraine (Soviet Union) politicians
People's Party (Ukraine) politicians
Governors of Zaporizhzhia Oblast
1957 births
Mayors of places in Ukraine
Recipients of the Order of Merit (Ukraine), 2nd class
Recipients of the Honorary Diploma of the Cabinet of Ministers of Ukraine